Ocejón is a mountain of the Sistema Central, in the Iberian Peninsula.

Geography 
The mountain is located in central Spain, in the Sierra de Ocejón subrange.

Access to the summit 
There are two routes to the summit, starting in Majaelrayo and Valverde de los Arroyos, two of the closest villages.

References 

Mountains of Castilla–La Mancha
Geography of the Province of Guadalajara
Two-thousanders of Spain
Sierra de Ayllón